92nd NBR Awards
Best Film:
Da 5 Bloods

The 92nd National Board of Review Awards, honoring the best in film for 2020, were announced on January 26, 2021.

Top 10 Films
Films listed alphabetically except top, which is ranked as Best Film of the Year:

Da 5 Bloods
 First Cow
 The Forty-Year-Old Version
 Judas and the Black Messiah
 The Midnight Sky
 Minari
 News of the World
 Nomadland
 Promising Young Woman
 Soul
 Sound of Metal

Top 5 Foreign Films
La Llorona
 Apples
 Collective
 Dear Comrades!
 The Mole Agent
 Night of the Kings

Top 5 Documentaries
Time
 All In: The Fight for Democracy
 Boys State
 Dick Johnson Is Dead
 Miss Americana
 The Truffle Hunters

Top 10 Independent Films
 The Climb
 Driveways
 Farewell Amor
 Miss Juneteenth
 The Nest
 Never Rarely Sometimes Always
 The Outpost
 Relic
 Saint Frances
 Wolfwalkers

Winners

Best Film:
 Da 5 Bloods

Best Director:
 Spike Lee – Da 5 Bloods

Best Actor:
 Riz Ahmed – Sound of Metal

Best Actress:
 Carey Mulligan – Promising Young Woman

Best Supporting Actor:
 Paul Raci – Sound of Metal

Best Supporting Actress:
 Youn Yuh-jung – Minari

Best Original Screenplay:
 Lee Isaac Chung – Minari

Best Adapted Screenplay:
 Paul Greengrass and Luke Davies – News of the World

Best Animated Feature:
 Soul

Breakthrough Performance:
 Sidney Flanigan – Never Rarely Sometimes Always

Best Directorial Debut:
 Channing Godfrey Peoples – Miss Juneteenth

Best Foreign Language Film:
 La Llorona

Best Documentary:
 Time

Best Ensemble:
 Da 5 Bloods

Outstanding Achievement in Cinematography:
 Joshua James Richards – Nomadland

NBR Freedom of Expression:
 One Night in Miami...

NBR Icon Award:
 Chadwick Boseman (posthumous)

References

External links
 

2020 film awards
2020 in American cinema
National Board of Review Awards